Vinicius Cantuária (born April 29, 1951) is a Brazilian singer, songwriter, guitarist, drummer, and percussionist. He is associated with bossa nova and Brazilian jazz.

Born in the Amazonian city of Manaus, Cantuária grew up in Rio de Janeiro and moved to New York City in the mid-1990s. His career spans several zones of Brazilian music. He founded the Brazilian rock group O Terço in the 1970s, released six solo albums in Brazil in the 1980s that include his hit songs "Só Você" and "Lua e Estrela", and pioneered the world of neo-Brazilian music with his first international album Sol Na Cara in 1996.

Since moving to the United States, Cantuária has been a leading figure in the downtown New York jazz and contemporary music scenes. His albums include collaborations with Arto Lindsay, Bill Frisell, Brian Eno, Laurie Anderson, Brad Mehldau, Marc Ribot, David Byrne, Ryuichi Sakamoto, and John Zorn.

In 1998, Cantuária contributed the song "Luz de Candeeiro" to the AIDS benefit compilation album Onda Sonora: Red Hot + Lisbon produced by the Red Hot Organization.

Cantuária has said that jazz, rock, and bossa nova are "three planets that move in one and the same orbit."

Discography

As leader
 Vinicius Cantuaria (RCA Victor, 1982)
 Gávea de Manhã (RCA Victor, 1983)
 Sutis Diferenças (EMI, 1984)
 Siga-Me (EMI, 1985)
 Nu Brasil (EMI, 1986)
 Rio Negro (Chorus Estudio, 1991)
 Sol na Cara (Gramavision, 1996)
 Tucumā (Verve, 1998)
 Vinicius (Transparent, 2001)
 Live: Skirball Cultural Center 8/7/03 (Kufala, 2003)
 Horse and Fish (Bar/None, 2004)
 Silva (Hannibal, 2005)
 Cymbals (Naïve, 2007)
 Samba Carioca (Naïve, 2010)
 Lágrimas Mexicanas with Bill Frisell (E1, 2011)
 Índio de Apartamento (Naïve, 2012)
 Vinicius Canta Antonio Carlos Jobim (Song X Jazz, 2015)

As sideman
With David Byrne
 Feelings (Luaka Bop/Warner Bros., 1997)
 Look into the Eyeball (Virgin, 2001)

With Arto Lindsay
 O Corpo Sutil (The Subtle Body) (Bar/None, 1996)
 Mundo Civilizado (Bar/None, 1997)
 Noon Chill (Rykodisc, 1998)
 Prize (Righteous Babe, 1999)
 Invoke (Righteous Babe, 2002)

With Caetano Veloso  
 Bicho (1977)
 Cinema Transcendental (1979)

With others
 Laurie Anderson, Life on a String (Nonesuch, 2001)
 Chico Buarque, Francisco (Kardum, 1988)
 Dominique Dalcan, Ostinato (Island, 1998)
 Bill Frisell, The Intercontinentals (Nonesuch, 2003)
 Carl Hancock Rux, Good Bread Alley (Thirsty Ear, 2006)
 Jesse Harris, Sub Rosa (Cristal, 2012)
 Smokey Hormel, Smokey's Secret Family (2009)
 Angélique Kidjo, Black Ivory Soul (Columbia, 2001)
 Sean Lennon, Half Horse, Half Musician (Grand Royal, 1999)
 Los Super Seven, Canto (Columbia, 2001)
 Marisa Monte, O Que Você Quer Saber de Verdade (EMI, 2011)
 Taeko Onuki, Lucy (Eastworld, 1997)
 Mauro Refosco, Seven Waves (MA, 1999)
 Towa Tei, Sound Museum (Elektra, 1997)
 Ana Torroja, Pasajes de Un Sueno (2000)
 Marcos Valle, Vento Sul (2002)
 Nana Vasconcelos, Contaminaçao (1999)

References

External links
Official site

1951 births
Living people
Bossa nova guitarists
Bossa nova singers
Brazilian jazz guitarists
Brazilian male guitarists
Brazilian jazz singers
Música Popular Brasileira guitarists
Música Popular Brasileira singers
People from Manaus
Male jazz musicians
Gramavision Records artists
MNRK Music Group artists
Bar/None Records artists
RCA Victor artists
EMI Records artists
Verve Records artists